The Repedea is a right tributary of the river Ruscova in Romania. It discharges into the Ruscova in the village Repedea.

References

Rivers of Romania
Rivers of Maramureș County